ERA–Circus is a UCI continental team founded in 2013 and based in Belgium. It participates in UCI Continental Circuits races.

In December 2017, Beobank–Corendon announced that Circus, a Belgian betting company had signed three-year sponsorship deal. Circus announced they would continue to sponsor this team until the end of the cyclo-cross season in March.

Team roster

Major wins
Internationale Sluitingsprijs Oostmalle, Diether Sweeck
Superprestige #7 MU - Middelkerke, Diether Sweeck
Superprestige #6 - Hoogstraten, Diether Sweeck
Krawatencross, Diether Sweeck
UCI World Cup #4 - Hoogerheide, Diether Sweeck
Bpost Bank Trofee #7 - G.P. Sven Nys, Diether Sweeck

References

UCI Continental Teams (Europe)
Cycling teams based in Belgium
Cycling teams established in 2013
2013 establishments in Belgium